Allisha Gray (born January 12, 1995) is an American professional basketball player for the Atlanta Dream of the Women's National Basketball Association (WNBA) and Elitzur Ramla of Israel. She won a gold medal in Women's 3x3 basketball, at the 2020 Summer Olympics.

She played college basketball for the North Carolina Tar Heels and South Carolina Gamecocks. After she was selected 4th overall by the Wings in the 2017 WNBA draft, Gray quickly wowed her fans, winning the WNBA Rookie of the Year award, and also there to lend her team a hand as they went into the playoffs.

High School career
She was a member of the U18 USA Basketball National Team as well as the 3-on-3 National Team. Named 3A state player of the year three times. She Led Washington County to a three-year record of 88-4 that included a perfect 32-0 record and a 3A state championship in 2010-11. As a junior, Gray averaged 32.0 points and 8.5 rebounds en route to a state runner-up finish. She then missed most of her senior season with a knee injury

College career
Heavily recruited by power programs, she was ranked the 7th overall player as part of a high profile 2013 recruiting class. After receiving offers from Maryland, Kentucky, South Carolina, etc., she eventually chose to attend North Carolina to play for Coach Sylvia Hatchell. After two years in Chapel Hill, Gray shockingly announced that she would be transferring. It was then reported that her reason for transferring was due to UNC's athletic-academic scandal. In May 2015, it was announced that Gray had transferred to South Carolina to play for Dawn Staley. Gray eventually won a National Championship in her first season of eligibility.

North Carolina and South Carolina statistics
Source

Professional career

WNBA
After helping lead South Carolina to the NCAA Championship, Gray opted to enter the 2017 WNBA draft. By entering, she would forgo her final season of college eligibility. She was drafted 4th overall by the Dallas Wings placing her in the city where she won a national title two weeks prior, and eventually pairing her with South Carolina teammate, Kaela Davis, who was selected 10th. In her rookie season, Gray immediately entered the Wings' starting lineup at the shooting guard. She started in all 34 games and averaged 13.1 ppg. On August 12, 2017, Gray scored a career-high 21 points in a 96-88 loss to the Connecticut Sun. The Wings finished as the number 7 seed in the league with a 16-18 record. The Wings were defeated in the first round elimination game 86-76 by the Washington Mystics. On September 19, 2017, it was announced by the WNBA that Gray won the 2017 Rookie of the Year Award.

In her second season, Gray continued her starting role with the Wings. With the arrival of all-star center Liz Cambage, Gray would have a reduced offensive load on the team. Gray averaged 9.2 ppg in her second season, helping the Wings to the number 8 seed with a 15-19 record. In the first round elimination game, the Wings lost 101-83 to the Phoenix Mercury.

In January of 2023, Gray was traded to the Atlanta Dream in exchange for draft picks.

Overseas
In June 2018, Gray signed with Elitzur Ramla of the Israeli League for the 2018-19 off-season.

WNBA career statistics

Regular season

|-
| style="text-align:left;"| 2017
| style="text-align:left;"| Dallas
| 34 || 34 || 27.2  || .381 || .299 || .803 || 3.9 || 1.3 || 1.5 || 0.6 || 2.1 || 13.0
|-
| style="text-align:left;"| 2018
| style="text-align:left;"| Dallas
| 34 || 34 || 26.7 || .403 || .270 || .863 || 3.4 || 2.4 || 1.3 || 0.2 || 1.4 || 9.2
|-
| style="text-align:left;"| 2019
| style="text-align:left;"| Dallas
| 34 || 29 || 30.4 || .457 || .384 || .848 || 4.1 || 2.3 || 1.2 || 0.4 || 1.4 || 10.6
|-
| style="text-align:left;"| 2020
| style="text-align:left;"| Dallas
| 20 || 14 || 26.2 || .464 || .352 || .831 || 4.2 || 1.3 || 1.1 || 0.3 || 1.1 || 13.1
|-
| style="text-align:left;"| 2021
| style="text-align:left;"| Dallas
| 25 || 16 || 27.8 || .438 || .366 || .862 || 5.2 || 1.7 || 1.0 || 0.8 || 1.4 || 11.9
|-
| style="text-align:left;"| 2022
| style="text-align:left;"| Dallas
| 33 || 33 || 32.9 || .423 || .408 || .798 || 4.8 || 2.5 || 1.1 || 0.7 || 1.3 || 13.3
|-
| style="text-align:left;"| Career
| style="text-align:left;"| 6 years, 1 team
| 180 || 160 || 28.7 || .422 || .348 || .831 || 4.2 || 2.0 || 1.2 || 0.5 || 1.3 || 11.7

Postseason

|-
| style="text-align:left;"| 2017
| style="text-align:left;"| Dallas
| 1 || 1 || 16.1 || .000 || .000 || .750 || 3.0 || 0.0 || 1.0 || 0.0 || 1.0 || 3.0
|-
| style="text-align:left;"| 2018
| style="text-align:left;"| Dallas
| 1 || 1 || 37.0 || .000 || .000 || 1.000 || 4.0 || 1.0 || 1.0 || 0.0 || 0.0 || 3.0
|-
| style="text-align:left;"| 2021
| style="text-align:left;"| Dallas
| 1 || 1 || 34.0 || .600 || 1.000 || 1.000 || 6.0 || 2.0 || 1.0 || 1.0 || 1.0 || 9.0
|-
| style="text-align:left;"| 2022
| style="text-align:left;"| Dallas
| 3 || 3 || 35.7 || .484 || .231 || .600 || 3.7 || 4.7 || 1.7 || 0.3 || 0.7 || 13.0
|-
| style="text-align:left;"| Career
| style="text-align:left;"| 4 years, 1 team
| 6 || 6 || 32.3 || .353 || .190 || .737 || 4.0 || 2.8 || 1.3 || 0.3 || 0.7 || 9.0

References

External links
 
 
 
 
 
 
 

1995 births
Living people
3x3 basketball players at the 2020 Summer Olympics
American women's 3x3 basketball players
American women's basketball players
Basketball players from South Carolina
Dallas Wings draft picks
Dallas Wings players
North Carolina Tar Heels women's basketball players
Medalists at the 2020 Summer Olympics
Olympic 3x3 basketball players of the United States
Olympic gold medalists for the United States in 3x3 basketball
People from Greenwood, South Carolina
Shooting guards
South Carolina Gamecocks women's basketball players
21st-century American women